Conus abrolhosensis is a species of sea snail, a marine gastropod mollusk in the family Conidae, the cone snails, cone shells or cones.

These snails are predatory and venomous. They are capable of "stinging" humans.

Description
Original description: "Shell small for genus, biconic in shape, spire elevated; body whorl shiny, polished, sculptured with numerous raised spiral cords; spiral cords become stronger at anterior end; shoulder sharp-angled, carinated; carina coronated on spire, with coronations becoming less developed and obsolete on final half of the body whorl; aperture narrow, shell color variable, ranging from orange (holotype) to white and blue-purple; holotype with scattered white patches around mid-body and anterior tip; spire whorls of holotype dark orange with evenly-spaced, oval-shaped white flammules around edge of periphery; on white and purple specimens, spire dark brown, with same pattern of evenly-spaced white flammules; protoconch large, mamillate; periostracum thin, translucent, smooth, with row of small tufts along shoulder carina and spire carina
that correspond to shoulder carinations."

The size of the shell varies between 11 mm and 30 mm.

Distribution
Locus typicus: "Off Parcel das Paredes, Abrolhos Archipelago, 
Bahia State, Brazil."
 
This marine species of Cone snail occurs in the Caribbean Sea 
and off the Abrolhos Archipelago, Eastern Brasil.

Etymology
"Named for the Abrolhos Archipelago and reef complex, 
Bahia State, Brazil - the type locality."

References

 Coltro, J. Jr. 2004. New species of Conidae from northeastern Brazil (Mollusca: Gastropoda). Strombus 11: 1-16

External links
 To World Register of Marine Species
 Cone Shells - Knights of the Sea
 

abrolhosensis
Gastropods described in 1987